An aluminum polymer composite (APC)  material combines aluminum with a polymer to create materials with interesting characteristics. In 2014 researchers used a 3d laser printer to produce a polymer matrix.

Aluminum foam 

Spherical aluminum foam pieces bonded by polymers produced foams that were 80-95% metal. Such foams were test=manufactured on an automated assembly line and are under consideration as automobile parts.

Thermal conductivity 

Experimentally determined thermal conductivity of specific APCs matched both the Agari and Bruggeman models provide a good estimation for thermal conductivity. The experimental values of both thermal conductivity and diffusivity have shown a better heat transport for the composite filled with large particles.

See also 
 Aluminum foam
 Aluminium composite panels

References

External links 

 

Composite materials
3D printing